Drew is an unincorporated community in southern Laclede County,  Missouri, United States. Drew is located on State Route B on a ridge east of Cobb Creek.

History
A post office at Drew was established in 1892, and remained in operation until 1930. The community has the name of S. E. Drew, a pioneer citizen.

References

Unincorporated communities in Laclede County, Missouri
Unincorporated communities in Missouri